Philip Norman may refer to:

 Philip Norman (artist) (1842–1931), British artist, author and antiquary
 Philip Norman (author), (born 1943), British dramatist and novelist